Karl Suessenguth (22 June 1893, Münnerstadt – 7 April 1955, Ischia) was a German botanist.

He studied under Karl Ritter von Goebel at the University of Munich, where in 1927 he became a professor of botany. From 1927 to 1955 he was curator of the Botanische Staatssammlung München. 

As a taxonomist, he classified many plants within the family Amaranthaceae. The botanical genera Suessenguthia (family Acanthaceae) and Suessenguthiella (family Molluginaceae) commemorate his name.

Written works 
He was an editor of the multi-volume Illustrierte Flora von Mittel-Europa (Illustrated Flora of Central Europe) and the author of the following works:
 "Amarantaceae of southeastern Polynesia" (in English) Honolulu, Hawaii, The Museum, 1936.
 Neue Ziele der Botanik, 1938 – New objectives of botany.
 Ueber einige amerikanische "Amarantaceae" und "Rhamnaceae", 1939 – On American Amarantaceae und Rhamnaceae. 
 Mitteilungen Der Botanischen Staatssammlung München (as editor) – Journal of the Botanische Staatssammlung München.

References 

1893 births
1955 deaths
Ludwig Maximilian University of Munich alumni
Academic staff of the Ludwig Maximilian University of Munich
20th-century German botanists
People from Bad Kissingen (district)
German taxonomists